Tree is the surname of:

Lady Anne Tree (1927–2010), British philanthropist and prison visitor
David Tree (1915–2009), English actor, grandson of Herbert
Dolly Tree (1899-1962), British costume designer 
Dorothy Tree (1906-1992), American actress, voice teacher, and writer
Felicity Tree (1894-1978) English baronetess and high society figure and daughter of Herbert
Herbert Beerbohm Tree (1852–1917), British actor
Iris Tree (1897–1968), English poet and actress, daughter of Herbert
Jeremy Tree (1925-1993), British racehorse trainer, son of Ronald
Michael Tree (1934–2018), American violist
Penelope Tree (born 1950), fashion model, daughter of Ronald
Ronald Tree (1897–1976), journalist, investor, and Member of Parliament
Viola Tree (1884-1938), English actress, singer, playwright and author and daughter of Herbert